God's Bible School and College is a Bible college in Cincinnati, Ohio, founded in 1900. It is of the Wesleyan-Arminian (Methodist) tradition.

History 
Originally known as God's Bible School, the college was founded by Methodist minister Martin Wells Knapp in 1900. It began as a diploma course, devoted almost exclusively to the study of the Bible and practical subjects. The goal of the institution was to enable the students to be effective workers in what Knapp called the "great, whitened harvest field." The original curriculum was called the Christian Worker's Course and in 1936 was standardized into a regular four-year collegiate course. At that same time, the Department of Education of the State of Ohio granted authorization to the college to confer baccalaureate degrees.

Academics 
God's Bible School and College has three academic divisions (Education and Professional Studies, Ministerial Education, and Music) and offers both traditional and fully online education. Through these divisions twelve areas of study are offered. The college offers degrees at the associate's, bachelor's, and graduate level.

Accreditation  
God's Bible School and College is authorized by the Department of Education of the State of Ohio to award associate and baccalaureate degrees and is regionally accredited with the Higher Learning Commission (HLC) of the North Central Association of Colleges and Schools. It is also accredited by the Commission on Accreditation of the Association for Biblical Higher Education (ABHE).

The college is a member of the Greater Cincinnati Consortium of Colleges and Universities.

Facilities
God's Bible School and College has six major buildings. The Administration Building houses administrative offices, the Revivalist offices, faculty offices, and classrooms. The Deets-Miller Student Center houses a dining hall, student snack bar, Presidential Dining Room, a full-size recreation area, classrooms, and faculty offices. The Knapp Memorial Building houses a chapel, a men's residence hall, and classrooms. The McNeill Music Hall houses faculty offices, classrooms, and practice rooms. The Revivalist Memorial Building houses a women's residence hall and the Aldersgate Christian Academy. The R.G. Flexon Memorial Library provides shelf space for 60,000 volumes, student study area, offices, and archives.

Ministries 
The college operates a K-12 Christian school (Aldersgate Christian Academy) and publishes the God's Revivalist.

The students of God's Bible School & College operate several inner-city ministries in downtown Cincinnati. They include the Main Street Chapel, Main Street Kid's Club, Laurel Homes Kid's Club, Mount Auburn Kid's Club, Teens of Power School, Teen Power, Teen Praise and Prayer Station. They also participate in local church, nursing home and jail ministries.

Notable alumni and faculty
 Oswald Chambers, author of My Utmost for His Highest, taught at God's Bible School & College
Phil Collingsworth, Christian recording artist, graduated from and worked at God's Bible School & College
Charles Cowman, Christian missionary and missions organization cofounder, attended God's Bible School & College
Lettie Burd Cowman, Christian missionary and missions organization cofounder, attended God's Bible School & College
 Lillian Trasher, Missionary, attended God's Bible School & College
 Emerson Stephen Colaw, United Methodist Bishop, attended God's Bible School & College
 Robert Smith, Jr., Charles T. Carter Baptist Chair of Divinity at Beeson Divinity School, attended God's Bible School & College
 Pilipo Miriye, First Evangelical Missionary from Papua New Guinea to Nigeria, attended God's Bible School & College
 Jeff Snyder, Former Student 2001-2002, Southern Gospel Singer for The Bowling Family & The Greenes; Worship Leader at Valley Forge Church in Elizabethton, TN

References

Further reading
 Brereton, Virginia Lieson. (1990). Training God's army: the American Bible school, 1880-1940. Bloomington, Indiana: Indiana University Press. .
 Carpenter, Joel A. (1999). Revive Us Again: The Reawakening of American Fundamentalism. Oxford: Oxford University Press. .
 Chambers, Oswald. (1986). Devotions for a Deeper Life: A Daily Devotional. ed. Glen D. Black. Zondervan. .
 Day, Lloyd R. (1949). A history of God's Bible School in Cincinnati 1900-1949. (Unpublished master's thesis). University of Cincinnati, Cincinnati, Ohio.
 Jordan, Phillip. (2009). "It’s Not Just the Destination: Global Village trips offer volunteers a new point of view." Habitat World.
 Kostlevy, William. (2010). Holy Jumpers: Evangelicals and Radicals in Progressive Era America. Oxford University Press. . 
 McCasland, David. (1993). Oswald Chambers: Abandoned To God : the life story of the author of My Utmost for His Highest. Grand Rapids, Michigan: Discovery House Publishers. .
 Robeck, Cecil M. (2006). The Azusa Street Mission and revival: the birth of the global Pentecostal movement. Thomas Nelson Inc. .
 Robins, R. G. (2004). A. J. Tomlinson: Plainfolk Modernist. Oxford University Press, USA. .
 Robert, Dana Lee. (1996). American women in mission: a social history of their thought and practice. Macon, GA: Mercer University Press. .
 Schwarz, Julius C. (1936). Who's Who in the Clergy, Volume 1.
 Smith. L. (2016). A century on the mount of blessings: The story of God's Bible School. Cincinnati, OH: Revivalist Press. 
 Thornton, Wallace, Jr. (2014). "When the Fire Fell: Martin Wells Knapp's Vision of Pentecost and the Beginnings of God's Bible School.  Asbury Theological Seminary Series in Pietist/Wesleyan Studies.  Lexington, Kentucky: Emeth Press.  .

External links 
 Official website

Bible colleges
Universities and colleges in Cincinnati
Christianity in Cincinnati
Educational institutions established in 1900
Greater Cincinnati Consortium of Colleges and Universities
Mount Auburn, Cincinnati
Methodist universities and colleges in the United States
1900 establishments in Ohio